Nicolae Vasilescu Karpen (December 10 (O.S.)/December 22 (N.S.), 1870, Craiova – March 2, 1964, Bucharest) was a Romanian engineer and physicist, who worked in telegraphy and telephony and had achievements in mechanical engineering, elasticity, thermodynamics, long-distance telephony, electrochemistry, and civil engineering.

Life
After studying at the Carol I High School in Craiova, he went to the School of Bridges, Roads and Mines in Bucharest. After graduating in 1891, he worked as a civil engineer for three years. He went to France to study physics at the University of Paris.  In 1904 he was awarded a PhD in physics for his thesis Recherches sur l'effet magnétique des corps electrisés en mouvement (Research on the magnetic effect of electrified bodies in motion). After a year as a professor at the University of Lille, he returned to Romania to teach at the School of Bridges, Roads and Mines, where he was appointed director in February 1920.  As a result of his efforts, the School was transformed later that year into the Polytechnic University of Bucharest. Vasilescu Karpen was the first rector of this university, serving in that capacity until 1940.

He was the engineer who introduced a permanent wire telecom bridge between Brașov and Bucharest. He introduced electrically transmitted "wired telegrams" in the Romanian Old Kingdom by 1920. He became a titular member of the Romanian Academy in 1923; stripped of membership by the new communist regime in 1948, he was restored to the academy in 1955.

Karpen Pile

The Karpen Pile is claimed to be a battery that has provided continuous energy for over 60 years, making it either a supremely effective method of storing energy or a hoax, furthermore some newspapers describe it as a perpetuum mobile, but most scientists disagree since such a device would violate the Second law of thermodynamics. The device is housed at the Dimitrie Leonida National Technical Museum by 2010. There were claims that it had been working there continuously for 60 years. The prototype has been assembled in 1950 and consists of two series-connected electric piles moving a small galvanometric motor. The motor moves a blade that is connected to a switch. With every half rotation, the blade opens the circuit and closes it at the start of the second half. The blade's rotation time had been calculated so that the piles have time to recharge and that they can rebuild their polarity during the time that the circuit is open. It uses platinum and gold electrodes and no detectable corrosion effect happens. Normally, one electrode should corrode and lose ions which should deposit around the other electrode. Apparently, this does not happen. The cell is just as basic as it gets: two pure electrodes immersed in pure sulfuric acid. Everything sealed. However, the fact that the electrodes are made of gold and platinum (the least reactive metals) and the very low density of the generated power could be the reason why the pile is still working.

See also
 Oxford Electric Bell
 Beverly Clock
 Pitch drop experiment

References

External links

Nicolae Vasilescu Karpen
 "Nicolae Vasilescu-Karpen (1870-1964)", short biography by Remus Răduleț
"For a continuous working of the Vasilescu-Karpen's concentration pile", by Mihai Dogaru and Mircea Dimitrie Cazacu
"University Politehnica of Bucharest", short history
 "Pila nemuritoare", I. Golea, Ziua, March 11, 2006
, The "Dimitrie Leonida" National Technical Museum

Romanian inventors
People from Craiova
Romanian scientists
Romanian electrical engineers
Romanian physicists
Electrochemists
Titular members of the Romanian Academy
University of Paris alumni
Academic staff of the University of Lille Nord de France
Academic staff of the Politehnica University of Bucharest
Rectors of Politehnica University of Bucharest
Carol I National College alumni
1870 births
1964 deaths
Romanian Ministers of Industry and Commerce